{{family name hatnote|Aletrinö, her Dutch patronymic surname|}}

Intan Aletrinö (born 30 June 1993) is an Indonesian-Dutch National Narcotics Board of the Republic of Indonesia Ambassador,  actress and TV Presenter, supermodel, who won the title of Puteri Indonesia Pariwisata 2016. She represented Indonesia at the Miss Supranational 2016 pageant in Krynica-Zdrój, Poland, where she placed in the Top 10, also won Miss Elegance and Miss Multimedia Awards. She is the great-granddaughter of Dutch physician Arnold Aletrino.

Early life and education

Intan was born in Venlo, Limburg, Netherlands from a Dutch father, Ricardo Andre Aletrino and Minangkabau mother, Emirita. She is fluently speaks four language; Bahasa Indonesia, English, German and Dutch. She holds a magister degree in Doctor of Law from Faculty of Law of Andalas University, Padang – West Sumatra and an exchange student to Utrecht University, Utrecht, Netherlands.

On 16 May 2016, Intan together with Puteri Indonesia - Kezia Roslin Cikita Warouw and Puteri Indonesia Lingkungan - Felicia Hwang Yi Xin was chosen as The Ambassador of National Narcotics Board of the Republic of Indonesia by head of National Narcotics Board of the Republic of Indonesia, Budi Waseso. On 2 February 2020, Intan Aletrinö married to a Minangkabauan-Dutch businessman, Ian Syarief Kleimer. Intan and Ian had previously been engaged on 1 December 2018. On 22 December 2020, she gave birth to her only son, Izra Rayyan Kleimer in Jakarta - Indonesia.

Pageantry

Puteri Indonesia 2016
Intan representing West Sumatra on Puteri Indonesia 2016, where she was crowned as Puteri Indonesia Pariwisata 2016 at the grand finale held in Jakarta Convention Center, Jakarta, Indonesia on 19 February 2016, by the outgoing titleholder of Puteri Indonesia Pariwisata 2015, Gresya Amanda Maaliwuga of North Sulawesi.

She crowned together with Puteri Indonesia; Kezia Roslin Cikita Warouw of North Sulawesi, Puteri Indonesia Lingkungan; Felicia Hwang Yi Xin of Lampung, and Puteri Indonesia Perdamaian; Ariska Pertiwi of North Sumatra.

Miss Supranational 2016
As Puteri Indonesia Pariwisata 2016, Intan represented Indonesia at the 8th edition of the Miss Supranational pageant held in Hala MOSiR (Hall of Sports), Krynica-Zdrój, Poland on 12 December 2016. She is wearing traditional kebaya designed by Anne Avantie as her evening gown. Intan brought a national costume with the Wayang Golek-inspired ensemble, is a Sundanese puppet arts from West Java, Indonesia, the UNESCO Intangible Cultural Heritage in Masterpiece of the Oral and Intangible Heritage of Humanity. The costume named "Enchanted Wayang Golek" designed by Jember Fashion Carnival. She ended up placed in the Top 10 and won Miss Elegance and Miss Multimedia Awards'' at the pageant. Stephania Stegman of Paraguay crowned Srinidhi Shetty of India as the new titleholder at the end of the event.

Filmography
Intan Aletrinö has presenting on her own several variety TV talk show.

Talk show

See also

 Puteri Indonesia 2016
 Miss Supranational 2016
 Kezia Roslin Cikita Warouw
 Felicia Hwang Yi Xin
 Ariska Putri Pertiwi

References

External links
 
 
 Puteri Indonesia Official Website
 Official Miss Supranational Official Website

Living people
1993 births
Puteri Indonesia winners
Miss Supranational contestants
Indonesian female models
Indonesian beauty pageant winners
Indonesian Christians
Indonesian television actresses
21st-century Indonesian actresses
Indonesian activists
People from West Sumatra
People from Padang
People from Venlo
Indonesian people of Dutch descent
Minangkabau people
Indo people